A list of Bangladesh films released in 1977.

Releases

See also

 1977 in Bangladesh

References

External links 
 Bangladeshi films on Internet Movie Database

Film
Bangladesh
 1977